Jorkins Point is a cape in Canada. It is located on Swindle Island in the Regional District of Kitimat-Stikine in the province of British Columbia in the southwestern part of Canada, 3,800 km (2,360 miles) west of Canada's capital, Ottawa.

Geography
Jorkins Point forms the southern tip of Swindle Island and lies at the confluence of Milbanke Sound and Finlayson Channel. There are an unusually large number of named landforms in the vicinity of Jorkins Point, including peninsulas, islands, bays, and features on the seafloor.

The terrain inland from Jorkins Point on Swindle Island is hilly to the northeast, but to the southwest it is flat. The highest point in the vicinity is 1.4 km  (0.9 mile) northwest of Jorkins Point and is 318 meters (1,043 feet) above sea level.

Population
The area around Jorkins Point is almost uninhabited, with less than two inhabitants per square kilometer (0.8 inhabitants per square mile). There are no communities nearby.

Climate

The climate in the area is temperate. The annual average temperature in the area is 6 °C (42.8 °F). The hottest month is July, when the average temperature is 16 °C (60.8 °F), and the coldest is December, at -2 °C (28.4 °F).

Notes

References

Central Coast of British Columbia
Headlands of British Columbia